Matej Bene (born April 11, 1992) is a Slovak ice hockey player. He is currently a free agent having last played for HC Topolcany of the Slovak 1. Liga.

Bene made his European Elite debut during the 2010-11 season playing in the Slovak Extraliga with HK Nitra.

Bene participated at the 2012 World Junior Ice Hockey Championships as a member of Team Slovakia.

References

External links

1992 births
Living people
HK 36 Skalica players
HK Nitra players
Kamloops Blazers players
MsHK Žilina players
Sportspeople from Nitra
Slovak ice hockey centres
Slovak expatriate ice hockey players in Canada